The elasticity of labor supply is the percent change in amount of labor supplied due to a percent change in wages.

The elasticity of supply is given by: change of supply of labor in % / change of salary in %

If the elasticity is higher than 1, then the supply of labor is "elastic", meaning that a small change in wages causes a large change in labor supply. If the elasticity is less than 1, then the supply of labor is "inelastic".

Generally, the elasticity of labor supply varies by occupation and the time frame being considered.

References

Elasticity
Elasticity (economics)